Marc Lombard from Thun, Switzerland (born March 9) served as the Director of the Kandersteg International Scout Centre and the Chairman of the Kandersteg International Scout Centre Foundation.

In 2016, Lombard was awarded the 349th Bronze Wolf, the only distinction of the World Organization of the Scout Movement, awarded by the World Scout Committee for exceptional services to world Scouting.

Lombard studied Sport Management at the University of Fribourg, serves as the Chief Executive Officer at "Bildungswerkstatt Bergwald" educational institution, and lives in Belp, Switzerland.

References

External links

 

Recipients of the Bronze Wolf Award
Year of birth missing (living people)
Scouting and Guiding in Switzerland
Living people